Pinghu may refer to:

Pinghu, Zhejiang, city in China
Pinghu, Guangdong, subdistrict of Longgang District, Shenzhen, Guangdong, China
Pinghu railway station, railway station in Shenzhen, Guangdong, China